Egerton  is a small community in the Canadian province of Nova Scotia, located in Pictou County. A railway line operated by Cape Breton and Central Nova Scotia Railway and formerly by Canadian National Railway passes through Egerton.

References

Egerton on Destination Nova Scotia

Communities in Pictou County
General Service Areas in Nova Scotia